Timothy Howard Davis (born July 14, 1970) is an American former professional baseball pitcher who played for the Seattle Mariners of Major League Baseball (MLB) from -.

Davis was drafted by the Seattle Mariners in the 6th round of the 1992 MLB draft out of Florida State University. He was first assigned to the Single-A Appleton Foxes of the Midwest League. In 16 games, he was 10–2 with a 1.85 ERA and 89 strikeouts. This performance earned Davis an All-Star berth and a promotion to the High-A Riverside Pilots. He started  on the MLB roster and had a 4.01 ERA in 42 games. He was demoted to Triple-A Calgary in August where he had a 1.80 ERA in 6 starts. In , he pitched in the Tampa Bay Devil Rays organization.

External links

1979 births
Living people
American expatriate baseball players in Canada
Appleton Foxes players
Baseball players from Florida
Calgary Cannons players
Durham Bulls players
Everett AquaSox players
Florida State Seminoles baseball players
Huntsville Stars players
Major League Baseball pitchers
Orlando Rays players
People from Marianna, Florida
Riverside Pilots players
Seattle Mariners players
St. Petersburg Devil Rays players
Tacoma Rainiers players